Shizishan station can refer to:
Shizishan station (Chengdu Metro), a metro station in Chengdu, China
Shizishan station (Suzhou Rail Transit), a metro station in Suzhou, China

See also
Shishan station (disambiguation)